The Flying Fifteen World Championship are an international sailing regattas in the Flying Fifteen keelboats organised by the host club on behalf of the International Flying Fifteen Calss Association and recoganized by the World Sailing the sports IOC recongised governing body.

Calender

Multiple World Champions

Medalists

References

World championships in sailing
Recurring sporting events established in 1979